Brian Scott (born 1988) is an American race car driver.

Brian Scott may also refer to:

 Brian Torrey Scott (1976–2013), American writer
 Brian Scott (rugby union) (born 1993), Irish rugby union player
 Brian Scott (Canadian politician)

See also
 Bryan Scott (born 1981), American football linebacker
 Bryan Scott (quarterback) (born 1995), American football quarterback
 Ryan Scott (disambiguation)